Programming Ruby is a book about the Ruby programming language by Dave Thomas and Andrew Hunt, authors of The Pragmatic Programmer. In the Ruby community, it is commonly known as "The PickAxe" because of the pickaxe on the cover. The book has helped Ruby to spread outside Japan.

The complete first edition of this book is freely available under the Open Publication License v1.0, and was published by Addison-Wesley in 2001. The second edition, covering the features of Ruby 1.8, was published by The Pragmatic Programmers, LLC in 2004.

An updated 4th edition covering Ruby 1.9 and 2.0 is available.

References

External links 

 First edition (for online reading) at RUBY-DOC.ORG
 4th edition at The Pragmatic Programmers

Programming Ruby (First Edition)
2004 non-fiction books
Ruby (programming language)
Books about free software
Computer programming books
Open Publication License-licensed works